William A. Carroll (January 9, 1875 – January 26, 1928), was an American silent film actor.

Biography
He was born on January 9, 1875, in Manhattan, New York City.

Entering films with the Selig and Vitagraph film company, Carroll starred in 140 films between 1911 and 1927, including such works as 1916's The Twinkler.

He died of a heart attack in 1928.

Selected filmography

 The Immortal Alamo (1911)
 The Goddess of Sagebrush Gulch (1912) - a villain
 One Is Business, the Other Crime (1912) - a foreman
 The Lesser Evil (1912) - in a smuggler band
 A Beast at Bay (1912) - a guard
 An Outcast Among Outcasts (1912) - a tramp
 A Temporary Truce (1912) - in bar / among rescuers
 Man's Lust for Gold (1912) - among the Indians (as William Carroll)
 Broken Ways (1913) - in posse
 A Welcome Intruder  (1913) - The Wagon Driver
 A Frightful Blunder (1913) - a customer
 A Misunderstood Boy (1913) - a vigilante
 The Left-Handed Man (1913) - an extra
 The Tenderfoot's Money (1913) - The Tenderfoot
 The Stolen Loaf (1913) - at dinner
 The Switch Tower (1913) - first federal agent
 A Gambler's Honor (1913) - in a bar
 During the Round-Up (1913) - the Mexican
 An Indian's Loyalty (1913) - the Accomplice
 The Battle at Elderbush Gulch (1913)
 The Conscience of Hassan Bey (1913)
 Almost a Wild Man (1913)
 Judith of Bethulia (1914)
 Lord Loveland Discovers America (1916)
 Embers (1916) - Wesley Strange
 Dulcie's Adventure (1916)
 The Twinkler (1916)
 My Fighting Gentleman (1916)
 John Ermine of the Yellowstone (1917)
 A Woman's Fool (1918) - Lusk
 The Magic Eye (1918) - Jack
 Hands Up! (1918) - Omar the High Priest
 Bill Henry (1919) - Uncle Chet Jenkins
 The Trail of the Octopus (1919) - Omar
 The Blue Bonnet (1919)
 The Lion Man (1919)
 Married in Haste (1919)
 One-Thing-at-a-Time O'Day (1919)
 The Screaming Shadow (1920) - Harry Malone
 A Motion to Adjourn (1921) - Joe Selinsky
 Fifty Candles (1921) - Henry Drew
 Chain Lightning (1922) - Red Rollins
 Remembrance (1922)
 Confidence (1922)
 Wanderer of the Wasteland (1924) - Merryvale
 Sporting Youth (1924) - Detective
 Women First (1924)
 Alimony (1924)
 K – The Unknown (1924) - Dr. Ed Wilson
 The Unwritten Law (1925) - Mr. Smart
 College Days (1926)
 Snowbound (1927) - Judge Watkins

External links
 

1876 births
1928 deaths
American male film actors
American male silent film actors
Male actors from New York City
20th-century American male actors